Kalyan-Dombivli is a twin city and it comes under Mumbai Metropolitan Region and it is a municipal corporation with its headquarters located in Kalyan in Thane district in the Indian state of Maharashtra. It was formed in 1982 to administer the twin townships of Kalyan and Dombivli. Kalyan has a history of over 700 years. Kalyan is also a major Railway Junction for the trains operating in Central Railway. 

In 2016, the government of India announced five cities of Maharashtra state for the Smart Cities project. Kalyan-Dombivli is one of them. The other four cities are Aurangabad, Nashik, Nagpur, and Thane.

Demographics
As of 2011 India census, Kalyan-Dombivli had a population of 1,246,381. Males constitute 52% of the population and females 48%. Kalyan-Dombivli has an average literacy rate of 98.06%, higher than the national average of 74.04%: male literacy is 98.11%, and female literacy is 95.73%. In Kalyan-Dombivli, 9.47% of the population is under 6 years of age. Kalyan-Dombivli is also considered one of the fastest developing city after Navi Mumbai.

References

External links 
 Kalyan Dombivli Municipal website

 
1982 establishments in Maharashtra
Twin cities
Cities in Maharashtra
Smart cities in India